Quincy High School (QHS) is a public secondary school located on Coddington Street in Quincy, Massachusetts, United States. It doubles as one of two high schools in the city of Quincy and as the vocational center. Quincy's mascot is known as the 'Presidents' and their school colors are Blue & White.

History
Quincy High School was founded in 1854 about a half-mile down Hancock Street (marked by the current High School Avenue) and moved to the former Central Middle School in 1894. It moved to Coddington Street in 1924. North Quincy High School was established at a separate location in 1926.

Construction of the new high school building was completed in 2010.

Athletics

Quincy is part of the Patriot League, and previously competed in the Atlantic Coast and Old Colony Leagues.

As of 2018, Quincy High School has had consistent success recently in both boys' and girls' volleyball and basketball. The track teams at Quincy High have presented some of the top competing high school athletes in the state in recent years.

Its rival is North Quincy High School, which faces Quincy in the annual Thanksgiving football game at Veterans Memorial Stadium. Despite the rivalry, Quincy High's track, crew, girls' hockey, swimming, rugby, sailing teams, and school band are joined with North Quincy's.

Notable alumni

 Priscilla Chan - philanthropist and wife of Facebook founder Mark Zuckerberg
 John Cheever - author
 Dick Dale - surf guitarist, attended Quincy High School through the 11th grade.
Ruth Gordon - actress
 Huntington "Tack" Hardwick - All-American college football star and original owner of the NHL Chicago Blackhawks
 Paul Reardon - Justice of the Massachusetts Supreme Judicial Court
 Robert Burns Woodward - awarded the Nobel Prize in Chemistry in 1965.

References

External links

Official website
Quincy Public Schools

Education in Quincy, Massachusetts
Schools in Norfolk County, Massachusetts
Public high schools in Massachusetts